The Sea Empress  oil spill occurred at the entrance to the Milford Haven Waterway in Pembrokeshire, Wales on 16 February 1996. The Sea Empress was en route to the Texaco oil refinery near Pembroke when she became grounded on mid-channel rocks at St. Ann's Head. Over the course of a week, she spilt 72,000 tons of crude oil into the sea. The spill occurred within the Pembrokeshire Coast National Park – one of Europe's most important and sensitive wildlife and marine conservation areas. It was Britain's third largest oil spillage and the twelfth largest in the world at the time.

Sailing against the outgoing tide and in calm conditions, at 20:07 GMT the ship was pushed off course by the current and became grounded after hitting rocks in the middle of the channel. The collision punctured her starboard hull causing oil to pour out into the sea. Tugs from Milford Haven Port Authority were sent to the scene and attempted to pull the vessel free and re-float her. During the initial rescue attempts, she detached several times from the tugs and grounded repeatedly – each time slicing open new sections of her hull and releasing more oil. A full scale emergency plan was activated by the authorities. News of the grounding was first reported at 21:18 on the BBC's Nine O'Clock News – just over an hour after she ran aground.

Over the next few days, efforts to pull the vessel from the rocks continued. Tugboats were drafted in from the ports of Dublin, Liverpool and Plymouth to assist with the salvage operation.

Environmental impact
The Sea Empress disaster occurred in Britain's only coastal national park and in one of only three UK marine nature reserves. The tanker ran aground very close to the islands of Skomer and Skokholm – both national nature reserves, Sites of Special Scientific Interest (SSSI) and Special Protection Areas and home to Manx shearwaters, Atlantic puffins, guillemots, razorbills, great cormorants, kittiwakes, European storm-petrels, common shags and Eurasian oystercatchers.

Birds at sea were hit hard during the early weeks of the spill, resulting in thousands of deaths. The Pembrokeshire grey seal population didn't appear to be affected too much and impacts to subtidal wildlife were limited. However, much damage was caused to shorelines affected by bulk oil. Shore seaweeds and invertebrates were killed in large quantities. Mass strandings of cockles and other shellfish occurred on sandy beaches. Rock pool fish were also affected. However, a range of tough shore species were seen to survive exposure to bulk oil and lingering residues.

A rescue centre for oiled birds was set up in Milford Haven. According to the Countryside Council for Wales (CCW), over 70% of released guillemots died within 14 days. Just 3% survived two months and only 1% survived a year.

The Pembrokeshire coast is home to common porpoises and bottlenose dolphins. The effects of the oil and chemical pollution on these species remains unknown. Significant numbers of both species were recorded in the waters off the Skomer Marine Nature Reserve during the spring and summer of 1996.

The main containment and dispersement of the oil slick at sea was completed within six weeks. However, the removal of oil on shore took over a year until the late spring of 1997. Small amounts of oil were still found beneath the sand on sheltered beaches and in rock pools in 1999 – three years after the spill.

The effects of the spill were not as bad as initially predicted. This was due in part to the time of year when the spill occurred. In February, many migratory animals had not yet arrived back in Pembrokeshire for breeding. Along with stormy weather which helped break-up and naturally disperse the oil, the effect on wildlife would have been much worse if the spill had occurred just a month later. The spill would undoubtedly have been catastrophic for both the environment and local economy if it had occurred during the summer months.

Much of the Pembrokeshire coastline recovered relatively quickly. By 2001, the affected marine wildlife population levels had more-or-less returned to normal.

Economic impact
There was an immediate ban on fishing off the coast of Pembrokeshire and south Carmarthenshire which had a devastating impact on the local fishing industry. The ban remained in place for several months and was lifted in stages. Many local fishermen received financial compensation for the loss of income due to the ban.

The spill occurred just a few weeks before the Easter break when many holidaymakers would be visiting the area. Some sheltered beaches and tidal estuaries were still covered with oil, but the main tourist locations of Tenby, Saundersfoot, Pendine, Manorbier and Bosherston were superficially cleaned.

Clean-up

A large clean-up operation began as soon as the Sea Empress started spilling oil. Volunteers and paid hands alike, came together to restore the beautiful beaches of Pembrokeshire.  In the immediate days and weeks that followed, one thousand people worked around the clock to rescue oiled birds and remove oil from beaches using suction tankers, pressure washers and oil-absorbing scrubbers. The main clean-up operation lasted several weeks and continued on a reduced scale for over a year.

Aftermath
Almost three years after the spill in January 1999, Milford Haven Port Authority (MHPA) was fined a record £4m after pleading guilty to the offence of causing pollution under the Water Resources Act 1991. The MHPA was also required to pay a further £825,000 prosecution costs by agreement.

The cost of the clean-up operation was estimated to be £60m. When the effects to the economy and environment are taken into account, the final cost is estimated to have been twice that, at £120m ($129602160 USD).

Following the spill, the Sea Empress was repaired and renamed five times. In 2004, she was sold and moved to Chittagong as a floating production, storage and offloading unit (FPSO). In September 2009, she was acquired by Singapore-based Oriental Ocean Shipping Holding PTE Ltd, renamed MV Welwind and converted from an oil tanker to bulk carrier.  In 2012, she was renamed for a fifth time to 'Wind 3', before Being scrapped in June 2012, in Chittagong

See also
Braer – Another single-hulled oil tanker which ran aground off the Shetland Islands in 1993 spilling 56,000 tonnes of oil
Torrey Canyon – Ran aground off the coast of Cornwall in 1969. It was en route to Milford Haven
MT Haven – (Formerly known as Amoco Milford Haven) a supertanker which sank off the coast of Genoa, Italy in 1991
Llangennech derailment - a train crash in 2020 which caused a major oil spill in south Wales

References

External links
Esso Portsmouth which exploded in July 1960, whilst berthed in Milford Haven
Christos Bitas tanker which ran aground 10 miles off the coast of Pembrokeshire in 1978, spilling 4000 tonnes of oil

Oil spills in the United Kingdom
Maritime incidents in 1996
Environment of Pembrokeshire
1996 in the environment
Maritime incidents in Wales
1996 disasters in the United Kingdom
1996 in Wales
20th century in Pembrokeshire
February 1996 events in the United Kingdom